The 1957 Wichita Shockers football team, sometimes known as the Wheatshockers, was an American football team that represented Wichita  University (now known as Wichita State University) as a member of the Missouri Valley Conference during the 1957 NCAA University Division football season. In its first season under head coach Woody Woodard, the team compiled a 1–9 record (0–3 against conference opponents), finished in fifth place out of five teams in the MVC, and was outscored by a total of 250 to 66. The team played its home games at Veterans Field, now known as Cessna Stadium.

Schedule

References

Wichita
Wichita State Shockers football seasons
Wichita Shockers football